Korçë County, officially the County of Korçë, is a county in the Southern Region of the Republic of Albania. The county borders on North Macedonia to the northeast and Greece to the southeast, the counties of Elbasan to the northwest, Berat to the west and Gjirokastër to the southwest. It is divided into six municipalities, Korçë, Devoll, Kolonjë, Maliq, Pogradec and Pustec, with all of whom incorporate thirty-seven administrative units.

Geography

Protected areas 

The Ministry of Tourism and Environment manages numerous natural sites and protected areas in Korçë County. In conjunction with numerous national natural sites and areas, the National Agency of Protected Areas has the Fir of Drenovë National Park and Prespa National Park under its administration. The UNESCO Ohrid-Prespa Transboundary Biosphere Reserve is also encompassed in the county.

Demographics

Most of the region's inhabitants are ethnic Albanians, but there are also important communities of Greeks (especially in the South), Macedonians (especially in the East), Aromanians (more concentrated in Western parts) and Roma. With regards to religion, the region is home to a large Muslim majority (many of whom are Bektashis) and a significant Orthodox Christian minority. According to the last national census from 2011, the county has 220,357 inhabitants. Ethnic groups in the county include Albanians, Greeks, Macedonians, Montenegrins, Aromanians, Romani, Egyptians.

See also 

 Geography of Albania
 Politics of Albania
 Divisions of Albania

References 

 
Korçë